Abiya may refer to:
Abiya, a form of the first name Abijah
Abiya, 1994 piano work by James Erber
Abiya, producer of hexamethylenetetramine in Mexico
ABiYA, collective name of Four Worlds, the spiritual realms in Kabbalah